Amyris, Inc. is a synthetic biotechnology and renewable chemical company headquartered in Emeryville, California. Amyris serves the specialty and performance chemicals, flavors and fragrances, cosmetics ingredients, pharmaceuticals, and nutraceuticals markets.

History

Amyris was founded in 2003. The company owns three brands, Biossance and Pipette, for beauty and skincare, and Purecane, a sugar substitute. The company went public on NASDAQ on September 28, 2010 (AMRS).

In November 2011, Amyris acquired Lansing, Michigan-based renewable chemicals and products company, Draths Corporation, for $7 million in stock. April 2019, the company raised $34-million in private placement of its common stock and warrants. The funding round was led by Foris Ventures and Dr. Wei-wu He, General Partner of Emerging Technology Partners, LLC, a life sciences-focused venture fund.

In 2020, Amyris received Bonsucro's Chain of Custody Certification, ensuring that the sustainability claims along the sugarcane supply chain are traceable from farmer to end user. During the COVID-19 pandemic, the company collaborated with the Infectious Disease Research Institute (IDRI) to advance a novel ribonucleic acid (RNA) vaccine platform, including accelerating the development of a COVID-19 vaccine.

Awards and recognition
Biossance, the skincare brand from Amyris, was recognized as Digital Innovator of the Year at the WWD Beauty Inc Awards in 2019.

References

External links 
Official website

Companies based in Emeryville, California
Biotechnology companies of the United States
Biotechnology companies established in 2003
Companies listed on the Nasdaq
2003 establishments in California
American companies established in 2003